Rajambal may refer to:

 Rajambal (1935 film), a 1935 Indian Tamil-language film
 Rajambal (1951 film), a 1951 Indian Tamil-language film
 T. Rajambal, Indian politician